Hesperolinon micranthum is a species of flowering plant in the flax family known by the common name smallflower dwarf flax. It is native to the west coast of North America from Oregon to Baja California. It may occur in Nevada. It grows in a number of open habitats, often on serpentine soils. This is a spindly annual herb producing a very thin stem 5 to 20 centimeters in height. Its small, sparse leaves are linear in shape. The tiny flowers have five white or pink-veined white petals each less than four millimeters long and protruding stamens with white or purple anthers.

References

External links
Jepson Manual Treatment
Photo gallery

micranthum
Flora of Baja California
Flora of California
Flora of Oregon
Flora of the Sierra Nevada (United States)
Natural history of the California chaparral and woodlands
Natural history of the California Coast Ranges
Natural history of the Central Valley (California)
Natural history of the Peninsular Ranges
Natural history of the Santa Monica Mountains
Natural history of the Transverse Ranges
Flora without expected TNC conservation status